The Canada Employment and Immigration Union (CEIU) is a Canadian labour union, with over 30,000 members in every Canadian Province and Territory. CEIU is affiliated with the Public Service Alliance of Canada (PSAC) and all CEIU members are automatically members of the PSAC.  As affiliated, the PSAC is the bargaining agent for CEIU and other component unions for negotiations with the Treasury Board.  CEIU is a member of the Program and Administrative Services (PA) group.

Many of CEIUs 30,000 members work for the Federal Public Service within Service Canada / ESDC, IRCC and the Immigration and Refugee Board (IRB) as Immigration officers, Employment Insurance adjudicators, Program Services Delivery Clerks (PSDCs) and Service Canada Payment and/or Benefit Officers.

Structure 
The membership is the cornerstone of CEIU.  There are over 150 locals across Canada, and each local administers its own affairs, elects its own officers and is responsible for the day-to-day relationship with local management.

Every three years, CEIU holds its Triennial convention.  This convention of CEIU delegates determines the union's policy on all matters affecting the members and their organization. The National President and the National Executive Vice-President are elected by delegates to the convention.

Between conventions, the National Executive, headed by the National President and the National Executive Vice-President, is responsible for the affairs of the Union. The National Vice-Presidents (NVPs), representing eleven geographic regions, departmental or other constituencies (IRCC, IRB, Women's issues, Human Rights), are elected by their respective members.

Staff 
CEIU is the only component of the PSAC to have its own network of union offices across the country. National Union Representatives in Newfoundland and Labrador, Nova Scotia, New Brunswick, Quebec, Ontario, Manitoba, Alberta and British Columbia work exclusively with CEIU members and their local leaders.

National Union Representatives assist members with grievances and other issues, provide training, and help Locals to organize and maintain a strong union presence in the workplace. Staff at the union's national office in Ottawa carry out research, assist in consultation with senior management, and provide financial, clerical and administrative support.

CEIU staff are represented by the Canadian Office & Professional Employees Union Local 225 which negotiates collective agreements on their behalf.

Executive 
The current National Executive is:
 Eddy Bourque – National President
 Crystal Warner – National Executive Vice-President
 National Vice-President, BC/YT – Sargy Chima
 National Vice-President, Alberta, NorthWest Territories, and Nunavut – Sabino Spagnuolo
 National Vice President, Saskatchewan and Manitoba – Chris Gardiner
 National Vice-President, Ontario – AM KaurSingh
 National Vice-President, Ontario – Phil Matheson
 National Vice-President, National Capital region – Dan Carrière
 National Vice-President, Quebec – Judith Côté
 National Vice-President, Quebec – Annik Beamish
 National Vice-President, Nova Scotia/Newfoundland and Labrador – Debbie Morris
 National Vice-President, New Brunswick/PEI – Charlene Arsenault
 National Vice-President for Women's Issues – Western Region – Lynda MacLellan
 National Vice-President for Women's Issues – Eastern Region – Jodi MacPherson
 National Vice-President for Immigration and Refugee Board (IRB) – Michaëlle Antoine 
 National Vice-President for Immigration, Refugee and Citizenship Canada (IRCC) – Helen King
 National Vice-President for Human Rights – Sebastian Rodrigues

References

External links
  History of UI in Canada, since the 1930s
 Canadian Government Site for EI
 Canadian Government Site for Maternity and Parental Benefits
 Library of Parliament publication on EI premiums
 CBC Digital Archives – On The Dole: Employment Insurance in Canada

Trade unions in Canada
Public Service Alliance of Canada